This is the list of eparchies (dioceses) of the Serbian Orthodox Church, based on the Article No. 14 of the Constitution of Serbian Orthodox Church and subsequent decisions of the Holy assembly of SOC (see: Official text of the Constitution of Serbian Orthodox Church, in English language ).

List 

List includes the eparchies of the Autonomous Ohrid Archbishopric that is under supreme jurisdiction of the Serbian Orthodox Church.

The territory of the Serbian Orthodox Church is divided into:
 1 patriarchal eparchy, headed by Serbian Patriarch with seat in Belgrade
 4 eparchies that are honorary metropolitanates, headed by metropolitans
 35 eparchies headed by bishops
 1 autonomous archbishopric, headed by archbishop (the Autonomous Archbishopric of Ohrid). It is further divided into 1 eparchy headed by the metropolitan and 6 eparchies headed by bishops.

See also
Serbian Orthodox Church#Structure
Eparchies of the Russian Orthodox Church
List of members of the Holy Synod of the Romanian Orthodox Church
Eparchies of the Georgian Orthodox Church

Notes

References

External links
Official text of the Constitution of Serbian Orthodox Church, in English language 

 
Serbian
Eparchies